Stijn Meert (born 6 April 1978) is a Belgian professional football manager and former player. He is currently the manager of Belgian Division 3 club Torhout.

He spent most of his club career playing for Zulte Waregem in the Belgian Pro League but as of 2012 is playing for Oudenaarde in the Belgian Second Division.

After his playing career, he continued as a manager. He started managing the reserves of Zulte Waregem in 2013. In 2019, he was appointed the new coach of Oudenaarde. In January 2021, Meert became manager of Torhout.

Honours
Zulte Waregem
 Belgian Cup: 2005–06

References

External links
 Stijn Meert at The Guardian
 

1978 births
Living people
Belgian footballers
S.V. Zulte Waregem players
K.V. Kortrijk players
Sint-Truidense V.V. players
Belgian Pro League players
Challenger Pro League players
Association football midfielders
Belgian football managers
Association football coaches